Genoa is an unincorporated community in Wayne County, West Virginia, United States. Genoa has a post office with ZIP code 25517.

The community has the name of Genoa Reed, the daughter of an early postmaster.

References

Unincorporated communities in Wayne County, West Virginia
Unincorporated communities in West Virginia